"Acapulco" is a song by Jason Derulo, released as a single through Atlantic Records on September 3, 2021, accompanied by a music video. The song has charted all across Europe and in Canada, Australia, and New Zealand.

Reception
Rolling Stone listed it among the worst songs of 2021, saying that it's proof of Derulo "cranking out harmless music".

Charts

Weekly charts

Year-end charts

Certifications

References

2021 singles
2021 songs
Atlantic Records singles
Jason Derulo songs